Not Today may refer to:
 "Not Today" (Mary J. Blige song)
 "Not Today" (Kelly Clarkson song)
 "Not Today" (BTS song)

See also
 Not Today, Thank You, a British radio comedy